Serapis Bey, sometimes written as Serapis, is regarded in Theosophy as one of the Masters of the Ancient Wisdom; and in the Ascended Master Teachings is considered to be an Ascended Master and member of the Great White Brotherhood. He is regarded as the Chohan (or Lord) of the Fourth Ray. C. W. Leadbeater wrote that Henry Steel Olcott was given occult training by Serapis Bey when his own master, Morya, was unavailable. A series of letters to Olcott, alleged  to be from Serapis, encouraging Olcott to support Blavatsky in the founding of the Theosophical Society were published in the book  Letters from the Masters of the Wisdom.

Incarnations
It is thought that Serapis Bey was incarnated as a high priest in one of the "Temples of the Sacred Fire" on Atlantis who migrated to Egypt at the time of the destruction of Atlantis. It is also believed that he was incarnated as the Egyptian Pharaoh Amenhotep III (who constructed the Temple of Luxor to the god Amun) and also as Leonidas, the King of Sparta, who was killed in 480 BC defending the pass of Thermopylae against the invasion of Greece by Emperor Xerxes I of Persia. According to the teachings of Agni Yoga, Serapis Bey was in past lives the Roman King Numa Pompilius, the philosophers Confucius, Plato and Lucius Annaeus Seneca. He is referred in the book Supermundane as "The Thinker".

Ascension
Adherents of the Ascended Master Teachings believe that Serapis Bey, after being killed as Leonidas in the battle of Thermopylae, immediately reembodied as Phidias (c. 480–430 BC), the greatest of all classical Greek sculptors. He then attained his Ascension, becoming an Ascended Master about 400 BC.

Identification with the Hellenistic deity Serapis

Serapis Bey has been identified by Theosophists and those adherent to the Ascended Master Teachings with the god Serapis who was the syncretic Hellenistic/Egyptian god used by King Ptolemy I as the deity of his capital city of Alexandria. Serapis was the patron deity of the Library of Alexandria.

Function in the spiritual hierarchy
C. W. Leadbeater wrote that many artists are on the fourth ray of harmony and beauty, which Serapis Bey is said to oversee as Chohan.  In the teachings of Alice Bailey the fourth ray is called the ray of harmony through conflict. Ascended Master Teachings organizations consider Serapis Bey to be the Chohan of the Fourth Ray of Purity, Harmony, and Discipline.

Skeptical view
The scholar K. Paul Johnson maintains that the "Masters" that Helena Blavatsky wrote about and produced letters from were actually idealizations of people who were her mentors.

Also see the article “Talking to the Dead and Other Amusements” by Paul Zweig in the New York Times October 5, 1980, which maintains that Helena Blavatsky's revelations were fraudulent.

Notes

Sources
 Leadbeater, C.W.  The Masters and the Path  Adyar, Madras, India: 1925 Theosophical Publishing House
 Prophet, Mark L. and Elizabeth Clare  Lords of the Seven Rays Livingston, Montana, U.S.A.:1986 - Summit University Press

Further reading
 Campbell, Bruce F. A History of the Theosophical Movement Berkeley:1980 University of California Press
 Godwin, Joscelyn. The Theosophical Enlightenment Albany, New York: 1994 State University of New York Press
 Johnson, K. Paul The Masters Revealed: Madam Blavatsky and Myth of the Great White Brotherhood Albany, New York: 1994 State University of New York Press
 Melton, J. Gordon Encyclopedia of American Religions 5th Edition New York:1996 Gale Research  ISSN 1066-1212 Chapter 18--"The Ancient Wisdom Family of Religions" Pages 151-158; see chart on page 154 listing Masters of the Ancient Wisdom; Also see Section 18, Pages 717-757 Descriptions of Various Ancient Wisdom Religious Organizations

Ascended Master Teachings
Masters of the Ancient Wisdom
Bey